Boško Čvorkov (Serbian Cyrillic: Бошко Чворков; born 14 June 1978) is a Serbian footballer.

External sources
 Profile and stats at Srbijafudbal
 Old stats at Dekisa.Tripod

Living people
1978 births
People from Ruma
Serbian footballers
Association football midfielders
FK Zemun players
FK Železnik players
FK Kolubara players
Serbian SuperLiga players
Expatriate footballers in Austria